Francesc "Xesco" Espar Moya (born January 4, 1963 in Barcelona, Catalonia, Spain) is a handball trainer and a former player.

He began playing handball in Sagrada Família school in Barcelona, GEIEG club in Girona and finally in the professional team of FC Barcelona Handbol.

After that he began to train some of the younger categories of FC Barcelona, being later the third trainer of the professional team and finally in the 2004-05 season became the trainer of FC Barcelona.

Currently, is the FC Barcelona Handbol trainer.

Trophies
As trainer
 1 European Cups (2004–2005)
 1 Liga ASOBAL (2005–2006)
 1 King's Cups (2006–2007)
 2 Pirenees Leagues (2005–2006 i 2006-2007)
 1 Spanish Supercups (2006–2007)

External links
F.C. Barcelona website 

1963 births
Living people
Handball players from Catalonia
Spanish male handball players
Spanish handball coaches
Sportspeople from Barcelona